Subham Nayak (born 25 October 1998) is an Indian cricketer. He made his first-class debut for Odisha in the 2017–18 Ranji Trophy on 24 October 2017. He made his Twenty20 debut for Odisha in the 2018–19 Syed Mushtaq Ali Trophy on 2 March 2019.

References

External links
 

1998 births
Living people
Indian cricketers
Odisha cricketers
People from Bhadrak
Cricketers from Odisha